Lactifluus albens is a species of mushroom in the family Russulaceae. It was described by Teresa Lebel, James K. Douch, and Luke Vaughan in 2021. The specific epithet is Latin (bleached), named for the pale cream to buff colouration of basidiomata. The type locality is Dwellingup, Australia.

See also 
 
 List of Lactifluus species
 Fungi of Australia

References

External links 
 

Fungi described in 2021
Fungi of Australia
Lactifluus
Taxa named by Teresa Lebel